For the 2005 season, AIK Fotboll was relegated to the second flight Superettan, just six years after playing Barcelona, Arsenal and Fiorentina in the Champions League of 1999–2000. Following relegation, AIK changed coach to Rikard Norling, and after a shaky start (including a shock defeat to Väsby), AIK soon were at the top of the table, promoted back into Allsvenskan, as arch rivals Djurgården won the national title.

Squad

Transfers

In

Released

Friendlies

Competitions

Overview

Superettan

League table

Results summary

Results by matchday

Results

Svenska Cupen

Squad statistics

Appearances and goals

|-
|colspan="14"|Players away on loan:
|-
|colspan="14"|Players who appeared for AIK but left during the season:

|}

Goal scorers

Clean sheets

Disciplinary record

References

AIK Fotboll seasons
AIK